Acumen is a triannual literary magazine with special emphasis on poetry and is based in London, the United Kingdom.

History and profile
Acumen began publication in 1985. The magazine, headquartered in Brixham, was founded by Patricia Oxley, who was also its editor until issue 100 in May 2021 when Danielle Hope replaced her in the post. Her husband William Oxley was its treasurer and interviews editor. The journal is published by Acumen Publications three times a year and covers poems by both famous and lesser known poets and reviews of poems. The magazine was formerly headquartered in Brixham before its head office was moved to London.

The magazine hosts an international poetry competition.

References

External links
 
 

1985 establishments in the United Kingdom
English-language magazines
Literary magazines published in the United Kingdom
Magazines established in 1985
Mass media in Devon
Poetry magazines published in the United Kingdom
Triannual magazines published in the United Kingdom
Magazines published in London